Hudson is a town in Penobscot County, Maine, United States. The population was 1,416 at the 2020 census.

History 
Hudson was first settled about 1800. In 1824, it became a plantation and was named "Jackson", probably after Andrew Jackson. In 1825, however, it was incorporated as the town of "Kirkland".  The name was changed to "Hudson" in 1854 after Hudson, Massachusetts. However Hudson, Massachusetts was not incorporated as such until 1866.

Geography 

Demographics

2010 census
As of the census of 2010, there were 1,536 people, 590 households, and 427 families living in the town. The racial makeup of the town was 97.7% White, 0.1% African American, 0.7% Native American, 0.2% Asian, and 1.3% from two or more races. Hispanic or Latino of any race were 0.7% of the population.

There were 590 households, of which 33.1% had children under the age of 18 living with them, 56.3% were married couples living together, 10.8% had a female householder with no husband present, 5.3% had a male householder with no wife present, and 27.6% were non-families. 17.5% of all households were made up of individuals, and 4.5% had someone living alone who was 65 years of age or older. The average household size was 2.60 and the average family size was 2.91.

The median age in the town was 40 years. 21.9% of residents were under the age of 18; 7.3% were between the ages of 18 and 24; 28.3% were from 25 to 44; 32.3% were from 45 to 64; and 10.1% were 65 years of age or older. The gender makeup of the town was 49.9% male and 50.1% female.

2000 census
At the 2000 census, there were 1,393 people, 508 households and 386 families living in the town. There were 677 housing units at an average density of 17.9 per square mile (6.9/km). The racial makeup of the town was 97.85% White, 0.50% African American, 0.72% Native American, 0.14% Pacific Islander, and 0.79% from two or more races. Hispanic or Latino of any race were 0.22% of the population.

There were 508 households, of which 37.6% had children under the age of 18 living with them, 62.8% were married couples living together, 7.9% had a female householder with no husband present, and 24.0% were non-families. 15.2% of all households were made up of individuals, and 3.5% had someone living alone who was 65 years of age or older. The average household size was 2.74 and the average family size was 3.03.

27.5% of the population were under the age of 18, 7.7% from 18 to 24, 34.7% from 25 to 44, 23.0% from 45 to 64, and 7.1% who were 65 years of age or older. The median age was 35 years. For every 100 females, there were 105.8 males. For every 100 females age 18 and over, there were 106.5 males.

The median household income was $38,594 and the median family income was $40,982. Males had a median income of $32,188 versus $21,146 for females. The per capita income for the town was $15,850. About 11.2% of families and 13.0% of the population were below the poverty line, including 17.1% of those under age 18 and 5.8% of those age 65 or over.

Notable people 

 Maxwell Anderson, playwright and screenwriter (What Price Glory?, Key Largo, All Quiet on the Western Front); Pulitzer Prize winner; owned a vacation home in Hudson

References

External links
Town of Hudson official website

Towns in Penobscot County, Maine
Towns in Maine